Blasdell is a surname. Notable people with the surname include:

 Doug Blasdell (1962–2007), American trainer and reality show personality
 Rob Blasdell (born 1970), Canadian lacrosse player
  (1929–1996), botanist

See also
 Blaisdell